Margaret Fairless Barber (pseudonym, Michael Fairless; 7 May 1869 – 24 August 1901), was an English Christian writer. Her book of meditations, The Roadmender (1902), became a popular classic.

Life
Barber was born in Rastrick, Brighouse, West Riding of Yorkshire, the youngest of three daughters. She was initially tutored at home by her mother, Maria Louisa, née Musgrave (1831–1890) and elder sisters. Barber was an eager reader but when her father, solicitor and amateur archaeologist Fairless Barber, died in 1881, her mother, unable to cope, sent her to relatives in Torquay where she attended a local school. It was here that she became aware of a spinal condition that would affect the rest of her life. She settled with her mother in Bungay, Suffolk.

In 1884, Barber went to London to train as a nurse at a children's hospital. She also travelled to Torquay to care for a relative and did charitable work in the East End of London. However, her health continued to deteriorate, including her sight and she was in continual need of care herself. To the dismay of her relatives, she was effectively "adopted" by the cultured Dowson family who took care of her in their family home.

Unable to continue her charitable work, Barber took up writing under the pseudonym "Michael Fairless", the "Michael" inspired by her childhood friend Michael McDonnell (1882–1956), subsequently chief justice of the British Mandate of Palestine. Her first book was the religious romance The Gathering of Brother Hilarius (1901) but it was The Roadmender (1902) that achieved a wild success, being reprinted 31 times in 10 years. A posthumous work, The Grey Brethren, was issued in 1905. It consisted of a number of fragments and short fairy tales, intended for juvenile readers; included among them were, A German Christmas Eve, The Manifestation, The Dreadful Griffin, The Discontented Daffodils, and The Fairy Fluffikins.

Barber died in Henfield, West Sussex while on vacation with the Dowsons. She is buried in nearby Ashurst. Her epitaph reads "Lo how I loved Thee".

References

Bibliography
A. Room (2004), "Barber, Margaret Fairless (1869–1901)", Oxford Dictionary of National Biography, Oxford University Press, accessed 2 July 2007 
W. S. Palmer, [M. E. Dowson] & A. M. Haggard, A. M.(1913) Michael Fairless: Her Life and Writings
M. E. Dowson (1931) "A biographical note" in The complete works of Michael Fairless
"The Tramp" [A. H. Anderson] (1924), The Roadmender's Country
A. Wilde (1938), "A Pilgrimage to the Roadmender Country: Memories of Michael Fairless", Sussex Daily News, 25 February 1938

External links

1869 births
1901 deaths
British religious writers
British spiritual writers
Pseudonymous women writers
People from Brighouse
People from Bungay
Women religious writers
20th-century British women writers
20th-century English writers
19th-century women writers
People from Rastrick
19th-century pseudonymous writers
20th-century pseudonymous writers